Trout Lake Township may refer to:

 Trout Lake Township, Chippewa County, Michigan
 Trout Lake Township, Itasca County, Minnesota

Township name disambiguation pages